Abhayadatta Sri (also known as Abhayadattaśrī or Abhayadāna) was a 12th-century Indian Buddhist monk notable for composing the Caturaśītisiddhapravrtti (the lives of the eighty-four mahasiddhas) which detailed the backgrounds of the mahasiddhas who were tantric masters. His work was later translated into Tibetan. His story on the lives of the mahasiddhas was influential in showing their highly unconventional paths to achieving realization.

He was a native of Campara which has been identified with Champaran district of Bihar, India. He was also a disciple of Vajrasana who was one of the last great siddhas in the eleventh century.

References

Indian Buddhist monks
Indian scholars of Buddhism
12th-century Buddhist monks